Phyllocnistis cassiella is a moth of the family Gracillariidae. It is known from Democratic Republic of Congo.

The larvae feed on Senna didymobotrya. They probably mine the leaves of their host plant.

References

Phyllocnistis
Endemic fauna of the Democratic Republic of the Congo
Insects of the Democratic Republic of the Congo
Moths of Africa